Artena lacteicincta is a species of moth of the family Erebidae. It is found in the north-eastern part of the Himalaya, Thailand, Sumatra and Borneo.

External links
 Species info

Catocalinae
Moths described in 1912
Moths of Asia